The Boston Red Sox are a Major League Baseball (MLB) franchise based in Boston, Massachusetts. They play in the American League East division. This page lists prospects selected by the team in the first round of the annual Major League Baseball draft.

Officially known as the "First-Year Player Draft", the draft is MLB's primary mechanism for assigning amateur baseball players from high schools, colleges, and other amateur baseball clubs to its teams. The draft order is determined based on the previous season's standings, with the team possessing the worst record receiving the first pick. In addition, teams that lost free agents in the previous off-season may be awarded compensatory or supplementary picks.

History
Since the institution of the MLB draft in 1965, the Red Sox have selected 78 players in the first round, through the 2020 MLB draft. Some of the selections have been compensatory or supplementary picks. These additional picks are provided when a team loses a particularly valuable free agent in the prior off-season, or, more recently, if a team fails to sign a draft pick from the previous year.

The primary position of each player drafted by the Red Sox in the first round, at the time they were selected, has been as follows:

Of the pitchers selected, 12 have been left-handed and 23 have been right-handed. Eleven of the players came from high schools or universities in the state of California, while Texas and South Carolina follow with eight and six players, respectively. The Red Sox have also drafted two players in the first round from outside the United States: Chris Reitsma (1996) from Canada, and Reymond Fuentes (2009) from Puerto Rico.

Several of the team's first-round selections have gone on to win notable awards. Nomar Garciaparra (1994 draft) won the Rookie of the Year Award with the Red Sox in 1997. Jim Rice (1971), Roger Clemens (1983), and Mo Vaughn (1989) each won a Most Valuable Player Award with the team. Clemens also won three Cy Young Awards with the Red Sox and another four with other teams for a total of seven, more than any other pitcher in MLB history. Clay Buchholz (2005) threw a no-hitter, the 17th in Red Sox franchise history, in his second major league start, tying him with Wilson Álvarez for the second-fastest no-hitter by an MLB pitcher. Jim Rice is the only first-round pick of the Red Sox in the Baseball Hall of Fame, having been elected to the Hall during 2009 balloting.

Seven of the team's first-round selections have gone on to win a World Series with the Red Sox: Trot Nixon (1993 draft) was a member of the 2004 championship team; Jacoby Ellsbury (2005) was a member of the 2007 team; Ellsbury and Clay Buchholz (2005) were members of the 2013 team; and Matt Barnes (2011), Blake Swihart (2011), Jackie Bradley Jr. (2011), and Andrew Benintendi (2015) were members of the 2018 team.

The Red Sox have never made the first overall selection in the draft. The earliest selection the team has had was the third pick; this occurred in 1967, when the team selected Mike Garman, a pitcher who went on to compile a career record of 22–27 while playing for five different MLB teams between 1969 and 1978. The team has signed all but two of their first-round picks across their draft history: Jimmy Hacker did not sign following the 1970 draft, and Greg McMurtry did not sign following the 1986 draft. To date, the only Red Sox first-round draft pick to make his MLB debut the same year that he was drafted was Craig Hansen, in 2005.

Three of the team's first-round selections went on to play in the National Football League (NFL) rather than in MLB: Noel Jenke (1969 draft; NFL 1971–1974), Greg McMurtry (1986 draft; NFL 1990–1994), and Corey Jenkins (1995 draft; NFL 2003–2004).

Key

Picks

See also
Boston Red Sox minor league players

Footnotes
Free agents are evaluated by the Elias Sports Bureau and rated "Type A", "Type B", or not compensation eligible. If a team offers arbitration to a player but that player refuses and subsequently signs with another team, the original team may receive additional draft picks. If a "Type A" free agent leaves in this way his previous team receives a supplemental pick and a compensation pick from the team with which he signs. If a "Type B" free agent leaves in this way his previous team receives only a supplemental pick.
The team lost their first-round pick in 1978 to the New York Yankees as compensation for signing free agent Mike Torrez.
The team lost their first-round pick in 1979 to the Oakland Athletics as compensation for signing Steve Renko.
The team lost their first-round pick in 1980 to the New York Mets as compensation for signing free agent Skip Lockwood.
The team gained a compensatory first-round pick in 1981 from the Baltimore Orioles for losing free agent Jim Dwyer.
The team gained a compensatory first-round pick in 1982 from the Texas Rangers for losing free agent Frank Tanana
The team gained a compensatory first-round pick in 1982 from the Oakland Athletics for losing free agent Joe Rudi.
The team gained a supplemental pick in 1987 for failing to sign 1986 first-round pick Greg McMurtry.
The team gained a compensatory first-round pick in 1989 from the San Diego Padres for losing free agent Bruce Hurst.
The team gained a supplemental first-round pick in 1989 for losing free agent Bruce Hurst.
The team lost their first-round pick in 1990 to the St. Louis Cardinals as compensation for signing free agent Tony Peña.
The team gained a supplemental first-round pick in 1991 for losing free agent Larry Anderson.
The team gained a supplemental first-round pick in 1991 for losing free agent Mike Boddicker.
The team lost their first-round pick in 1992 to the New York Mets as compensation for signing free agent Frank Viola.
The team gained a compensatory first-round pick in 1995 from the Cincinnati Reds for losing free agent Damon Berryhill.
The team gained a supplemental first-round pick in 1996 for losing free agent Erik Hanson.
The team gained a supplemental first-round pick in 1997 for losing free agent Roger Clemens.
The team gained a compensatory first-round pick in 1999 from the Los Angeles Angels for losing free agent Mo Vaughn.
The team gained a supplemental first-round pick in 1999 for losing free agent Mo Vaughn.
The team gained a supplemental first-round pick in 1999 for losing free agent Greg Swindell.
The team lost their first-round pick in 2001 to the Cleveland Indians as compensation for signing free agent Manny Ramirez.
The team lost their first-round pick in 2002 to the Oakland Athletics as compensation for signing free agent Johnny Damon.
The teamx gained a supplemental first-round pick in 2003 for losing free agent Cliff Floyd.
The team lost their first-round pick in 2004 to the Oakland Athletics as compensation for signing free agent Keith Foulke.
The team gained a compensatory first-round pick in 2005 from the Los Angeles Angels for losing free agent Orlando Cabrera.
The team gained a compensatory first-round pick in 2005 from the Los Angeles Dodgers for losing free agent Derek Lowe.
The team gained a supplemental first-round pick in 2005 for losing free agent Pedro Martínez.
The team gained a supplemental first-round pick in 2005 for losing free agent Orlando Cabrera
The team gained a supplemental first-round pick in 2005 for losing free agent Derek Lowe.
The team gained a compensatory first-round pick in 2006 from the New York Yankees for losing free agent Johnny Damon.
The team gained a supplemental first-round pick in 2006 for losing free agent Johnny Damon.
The team gained a supplemental first-round pick in 2006 for losing free agent Bill Mueller.
The team gained a supplemental first-round pick in 2007 for losing free agent Álex González.
The team gained a supplemental first-round pick in 2007 for losing free agent Keith Foulke.
The team gained a supplemental first-round pick in 2008 for losing free agent Éric Gagné.
The team gained a supplemental first-round pick in 2010 for losing free agent Billy Wagner.
The team gained a supplemental first-round pick in 2010 for losing free agent Jason Bay.
The team gained a compensatory first-round pick in 2011 for losing free agent Víctor Martínez.
The team gained a compensatory first-round pick in 2011 for losing free agent Adrián Beltré.
The team gained a supplemental first-round pick in 2011 for losing free agent Víctor Martínez.
The team gained a supplemental first-round pick in 2011 for losing free agent Adrián Beltré.
The team gained a compensatory first-round pick in 2012 for losing free agent Jonathan Papelbon.
The team gained a supplemental first-round pick in 2012 for losing free agent Jonathan Papelbon.
The team gained a compensatory first-round pick in 2014 for losing free agent Jacoby Ellsbury.
The team did not have a first-round pick in 2019 due to being more than $40 million over the MLB luxury tax threshold.

References
General references

In-text citations

Further reading

External links
MLB Draft Tracker at MLB.com (searchable by year and team)

First-round draft picks
Major League Baseball first-round draft picks